Austinburg may refer to:

 Austinburg, Ohio, a census-designated place in Austinburg Township, Ashtabula County, Ohio, United States
 Austinburg, Pennsylvania, a village in Brookfield Township, Tioga County, Pennsylvania, United States
 Austinburg Township, Ashtabula County, Ohio, United States

See also 
 Austin (disambiguation)
 Austinville (disambiguation)
 Austintown